Maulana Salahuddin Ayyubi is a Pakistani politician who has been a member of the National Assembly of Pakistan since August 2018.

Political career
He was elected to the National Assembly of Pakistan from Constituency NA-263 (Killa Abdullah) as a candidate of Muttahida Majlis-e-Amal in 2018 Pakistani general election.

References

Living people
Pakistani MNAs 2018–2023
Muttahida Majlis-e-Amal MNAs
Year of birth missing (living people)